The 2016 season is Bangkok United's 6th season in the Thai Premier League on 2009–2010 and since 2013, on the name of Bangkok United.
This is Bangkok United's name changing.
1988–2008 as Bangkok University Football Club (Bangkok University)
2009–present as Bangkok United Football Club (Bangkok United)

Players

Out on loan

Foreign Players

Pre-season and friendlies

Thai League

Thai FA Cup
Chang FA Cup

Thai League Cup
Toyota League Cup

Squad goals statistics

Transfers
First Thai footballer's market is opening on December 27, 2015 to January 28, 2016
Second Thai footballer's market is opening on June 3, 2016 to June 30, 2016

In

Out

Loan out

Notes

BU
2016